List of rivers in Maranhão (Brazilian State).

The list is arranged by drainage basin from east to west, with respective tributaries indented under each larger stream's name and ordered from downstream to upstream. All rivers in Maranhão drain to the Atlantic Ocean.

By drainage basin 

 Parnaíba River
 Buriti River
 Das Balsas River
 Balsinhas River
 Medonho River
 Parnaìbinha River
 Água Quente River
 Magu River
 Barro Duro River
 Preguiças River
 Alegre River
 Periá River
 Axuí River
 Itapecuru River
 Munim River
 Iguará River
 Preto River
 Peritoró River
 Tapuio River
 Pirapemas River
 Codòzinho River
 Saco River
 Gameleira River
 Itapecuruzinho River
 Correntes River
 Balseira River
 Alpercatas River
 Mearim River
 Grajaú River
 Santana River
 Das Flores River
 Pacuma River
 Corda River
 Enjeitado River
 Pindaré River
 Zutia River
 Caru River
 Buriticupu River
 Aurá River
 Pericumã River
 Uru River
 Turiaçu River
 Caxias River
 Das Almas River
 Paraná River
 Maracacumé River
 Macaxeira River
 Tromaí River
 Gurupí River
 Cajuapara River (Açailândia River)
 Tocantins River
 Lajeado River
 Itaxueiras River
 Farinha River
 Manuel Alves Grande River
 Sereno River

Alphabetically 

 Água Quente River
 Alegre River
 Das Almas River
 Alpercatas River
 Aurá River
 Axuí River
 Das Balsas River
 Balseira River
 Balsinhas River
 Barro Duro River
 Buriti River
 Buriticupu River
 Cajuapara River (Açailândia River)
 Caru River
 Caxias River
 Codòzinho River
 Corda River
 Correntes River
 Das Flores River
 Enjeitado River
 Farinha River
 Gameleira River
 Grajaú River
 Gurupí River
 Iguará River
 Itapecuru River
 Itapecuruzinho River
 Itaxueiras River
 Lajeado River
 Macaxeira River
 Magu River
 Manuel Alves Grande River
 Maracacumé River
 Mearim River
 Medonho River
 Munim River
 Pacuma River
 Paraná River
 Parnaíba River
 Parnaìbinha River
 Periá River
 Pericumã River
 Peritoró River
 Pindaré River
 Pirapemas River
 Preguiças River
 Preto River
 Saco River
 Santana River
 Sereno River
 Tapuio River
 Tocantins River
 Tromaí River
 Turiaçu River
 Uru River
 Zutia River

References
 Map from Ministry of Transport
  GEOnet Names Server

 
Maranh
Environment of Maranhão